Kristoffer Halvorsen (born 13 April 1996) is a Norwegian cyclist, who currently rides for UCI ProTeam .

Career
On 13 October 2016, Halvorsen won the Men's under-23 road race in the 2016 UCI Road World Championships.

2018
Halvorsen signed for  after two seasons with the Norwegian continental team . Halvorsen was due to make his  debut, in the Tour Down Under, leading his new team in the sprints. However, on 14 January, Halvorsen crashed at the People's Choice Classic, fracturing his hand and thereby ruling him out of the Tour Down Under. On 16 March, he came in second at the Handzame Classic.

Major results

2013
 1st Stage 1 Trofeo Karlsberg
 1st Stage 3 Tour of Istria
2016
 1st  Road race, UCI Under-23 Road World Championships
 1st Grand Prix d'Isbergues
 Olympia's Tour
1st Stages 3b & 4
 1st Stage 3 Tour de l'Avenir
 2nd Nokere Koerse
 4th Overall ZLM Tour
1st Stage 1 (TTT)
 9th Kattekoers
2017
 1st Handzame Classic
 Tour de l'Avenir
1st  Points classification
1st Stage 3
 5th Road race, UEC European Under-23 Road Championships
 5th Omloop Eurometropool
2018
 2nd Handzame Classic
2019
 1st Stage 5 Herald Sun Tour
 2nd Overall Tour of Norway
1st  Young rider classification
1st Stage 6
 2nd Bredene Koksijde Classic
 6th Three Days of Bruges–De Panne
2021
 1st Stage 3 Okolo Slovenska
 3rd Overall Boucles de la Mayenne
 8th Nokere Koerse
 10th Dwars door het Hageland
2023
 9th Bredene Koksijde Classic

References

External links

1996 births
Living people
Norwegian male cyclists
Sportspeople from Kristiansand